Hans Herbert Burger (June 4, 1909 Prague – November 13, 1990, Munich), also known as Hanuš Burger, Hans Burger, and Jan Burger, as well as under the pseudonyms Hans Herbert and Petr Hradec, was a theater, film, and television director, playwright and author of books and screenplays, including the documentary film Crisis (1939), and the German language version of Death Mills (1945), supervised by Billy Wilder. He was of Jewish descent.

References

External links 
 

1909 births
1990 deaths
Czech film directors
United States Army personnel of World War II
United States Army soldiers
Ritchie Boys
Czech Jews